Zinoviy Vasyliv is a Ukrainian retired footballer.

Career
On August 21, 1992, he began his football career at Khutrovyk Tysmenytsia. On March 5, 1995, he made his debut for Prikarpatye Ivano-Frankovsk in a match against Dynamo Kyiv. After that he played again in "Khutrovyk", and also played 1 match in Krystal Chortkiv. In the summer of 1998 he moved to Desna Chernihiv. During the winter break of the 1998–99 season, he transferred to Vinnytsia. In early 2001 he returned to Prikarpatye Ivano-Frankovsk. He also played 2 matches for Burshtyn's Energetika, and in August left for Moldova, where he defended the colors of the first-league Happy End (Kamianka). In early 2003 he returned home and then played in Prikarpatye Ivano-Frankovsk in the amateur championship of Ukraine. In the 2003–04 season he performed at the Techno-Center club (Rohatyn). In the summer of 2004 he accepted an invitation to the newly created Fakel (Ivano-Frankivsk), where at the end of the year he ended his career as a professional football player. After that he played in amateur clubs "Luzhany", "Karpaty" (Yaremche), Khutrovyk Tysmenytsia and "Cheremosh" (Verkhovyna).

Coach career
Since July 2016 he has been working in the coaching staff of Prykarpattia Ivano-Frankivsk.

References

External links 
 Zinoviy Vasyliv footballfacts.ru
 Zinoviy Vasyliv allplayers.in.ua

1973 births
Living people
FC Desna Chernihiv players
FC Khutrovyk Tysmenytsia players
FC Spartak Ivano-Frankivsk players
FC Krystal Chortkiv players
FC Podillya Khmelnytskyi players
FC Enerhetyk Burshtyn players
FC Tekhno-Centre Rohatyn players
FC Prykarpattia Ivano-Frankivsk (2004) players
Ukrainian footballers
Ukrainian Premier League players
Ukrainian First League players
Ukrainian Second League players
Ukrainian expatriate sportspeople in Moldova
Expatriate footballers in Moldova
Association football midfielders